Thom Flodqvist is a Swedish professional ice hockey centre who currently plays for Södertälje SK of the Elitserien.

References

External links

Living people
Södertälje SK players
Year of birth missing (living people)
Swedish ice hockey centres